The 1996–97 season was the 62nd season for Real Zaragoza in its history. The club competed in La Liga and Copa del Rey.

Summary
During summer Alfonso Solans in his 5th season as President, reinforced the squad with several players such as midfielder Kily González and Brazilian centre back Gilmar whom were transferred in from Boca Juniors and Cruzeiro respectively. Also arrived midfielder Vladislav Radimov, Austrian Goalkeeper Otto Konrad, two defenders from Real Madrid left back Miquel Soler and right back Quique Sanchez Flores the latter discarded by Fabio Capello during pre-season. On the contrary striker Sebastian Rambert, midfielder Sergio Berti, centre back Paqui, Goalkeeper Andoni Cedrun (after 12 campaigns), José Aurelio Gay (after 5 years) and Defender Fernando Caceres (after three seasons) all of them left the club. However, in his 6th season as head coach Victor Fernández found a chaotic start of season and after 9 winless matches, left the club after six years on 7 November 1996. President Solans appointed Víctor Espárrago as new manager only to drive the club to relegation zone. Finally, Luis Costa returned back after several years to Zaragoza and the squad avoided the Segunda Division on the final league rounds thanks to decent performances delivered by Gus Poyet, Fernando Morientes, Gustavo Adrián López and Kily González

Meanwhile, in Copa del Rey the club was early eliminated in Third round defeated by Racing Santander.

Squad

Transfers

Winter

Competitions

La Liga

League table

Position by round

Matches

Copa del Rey

Second round

Third round

Statistics

Players statistics

See also
  BDFutbol

References

Real Zaragoza seasons
Spanish football clubs 1996–97 season